The Regatta 39 is a French sailboat that was designed by Tony Castro as a racer and first built in 1982.

The boats uses the same hull design as the 1982 Sun Shine 36 and 1983 Sun Shine 38.

Production
The design was built by Jeanneau in France, starting in 1982, but it is now out of production.

Design
The Regatta 39 is a racing keelboat, built predominantly of fiberglass. It has a fractional sloop rig or optional masthead sloop rig. The hull has a raked stem, a sharply reverse transom, an internally mounted spade-type rudder controlled by a wheel and a fixed fin keel. It displaces  and carries  of ballast.

See also
List of sailing boat types

Related development
Sun Shine 36
Sun Shine 38

References

Keelboats
1980s sailboat type designs
Sailing yachts
Sailboat type designs by Tony Castro
Sailboat types built by Jeanneau